Till Human Voices Wake Us may refer to:

 "Till human voices wake us, and we drown", the final line in the poem "The Love Song of J. Alfred Prufrock" by T.S. Eliot
 Till Human Voices Wake Us (film), an Australian film starring Guy Pearce and Helena Bonham Carter
 Till Human Voices Wake Us, a science fiction novel by Mark Budz
 a short story by Lewis Shiner
 a short story by Lisa Tuttle
 Until Human Voices Wake Us And We Drown, a boxed set collection of five 10" vinyl records released by Norwegian record label Rune Grammofon